Yuri's Day may refer to:
Yuri's Day in Autumn or George's Day in Autumn, a Slavic religious holiday
Yuri's Day in Spring or Đurđevdan, a Slavic religious holiday
Yuri's Day (film), a 2008 Russian drama film

See also
Saint George's Day
Yuri's Night